The Fletcher Farm School is an arts and crafts school in Ludlow, Vermont, USA, operated by the non-profit Society of Vermont Artists and Craftsmen.
Courses are given on weekends in winter and spring, and during the summer. 
The school teaches a broad range of skills including fiber arts, woodworking, pottery, jewelry and photography.

Location

The school is on Vermont Route 103 between Ludlow and Proctorsville.
It lies in Vermont's beautiful Green Mountains.
The property is at the east end of the village of Ludlow. It was settled in 1783 by Jesse Fletcher and Lucy Keyes. 
The first frame house they built is said to be the oldest in the town. In 1805 they built a larger addition. Both were still in use as of 2014. 
The property stayed in the family, and successive owners added buildings.
These include barns and cabins where visitors can stay during summer courses.
At other times students can stay in Ludlow. The Society of Vermont Artists and Craftsmen runs a small arts-and-crafts store at the school in summer.

School history

Allen M. Fletcher, a banker, was governor of Vermont in 1912–15. His widow and daughters gave the property to the YWCA in 1928 for use as a training school. The program did not succeed and in 1933 the YWCA returned the property to the Fletchers.
Later that year a non-profit educational foundation was formed named Fletcher Farm Inc.
The original trustees included Dorothy Canfield Fisher and Robert Frost.

The school gave various adult education courses over the next fifteen years.
For example, in the summer of 1934 Grace Coyle organized a two-week group work institute for forty YWCA and settlement house workers at Fletcher Farm.
In 1935 two theologians, Paul Tillich and Henry Nelson Wieman, spent ten days at a religious retreat at Fletcher Farm. In 1955, Martin Luther King Jr. wrote his doctoral dissertation on the differences in the two men's views of God.

In 1948 the farmhouse, sugar house and barns were leased to the non-profit Society of Vermont Craftsmen.
They have operated the Fletcher Farm Craft School ever since.
The noted weaver Berta Frey was an instructor at the Fletcher Farm School in the early years.
Irene Slater taught at the school in the 1950s, described as a "professional decorator, specializing in the reproduction of reverse painting of old clock and mirror glasses. Collector of original pieces."
Ronald Alfred Slayton taught summer courses at the school in the 1950s and 1960s, where he developed a naturalistic style of watercolor painting, rich in color.
Joseph Skinger taught jewelry for several years at the school.

Programs

Students are generally mature adults.
Fees cover food and lodging, tuition and studio space.
The school offers the oldest and most respected crafts program in Vermont. Subjects have included off-loom weaving, wooden-spoon carving, quilting, pottery, bookbinding and gourd or birch-bark vessel design.
In 2014 the Winter/Spring classes included basketry, fiber arts, fine arts and photography, jewelry and lapidary. 
The summer courses included basketry, clay, early American decoration, fiber arts, fine arts and photography, glass, jewelry, quilting and fabrics, specialty arts and crafts and wood and woodcarving.

References

Sources

Technical schools
Schools in Windsor County, Vermont
Crafts educators